The Hunt for the Gingerbread Man is a 2007 studio album by American rapper MF Grimm.

Reception
Jody Macgregor of AllMusic gave the album 3 stars out of 5, calling it "candy rap in the most literal sense of the phrase". Evan Sawdey of PopMatters gave the album 7 stars out of 10, describing it as "another amazingly strong album by a rapper that's deserving of a much wider audience".

Meanwhile, Ian Cohen of Pitchfork gave the album a 3.5 out of 10, stating that "the beats are so close to backpacker parody that Party Fun Action Committee can stay retired".

Track listing

References

External links
 

2007 albums
MF Grimm albums
Concept albums